The 2009 NASCAR Camping World Truck Series was the fifteenth season of the Camping World Truck Series, the third highest stock car racing series sanctioned by NASCAR in the United States. It was contested over twenty-five races, beginning with the NextEra Energy Resources 250 at Daytona International Speedway and ending with the Ford 200 at Homestead-Miami Speedway. The season was the first under the Camping World sponsorship banner. Camping World, announced on October 23, 2008, that they would sponsor the series for the next seven seasons. Ron Hornaday Jr. won and clinched the championship for Kevin Harvick, Inc. at Phoenix, one race early.

2009 teams and drivers

Complete schedule

Part-time schedule

Schedule 

 *This race was delayed from its scheduled start on Fox on Saturday due to heavy rain.

Races

NextEra Energy Resources 250
The NextEra Energy Resources 250 was held on February 13 at Daytona International Speedway. Colin Braun won the pole for the event but Todd Bodine won the race.

Failed to qualify: Andy Lally (#28), Norm Benning (#57), Marc Mitchell (#89).

NOTE: Ron Hornaday Jr. suffered a 25-point penalty for rule infractions found in his truck during post-race inspection.

San Bernardino County 200 
The San Bernardino County 200 was held on February 21 at Auto Club Speedway. Kyle Busch won the pole.

Failed to qualify: Mike Harmon (#89).

American Commercial Lines 200 
The American Commercial Lines 200 was held on March 7 at Atlanta Motor Speedway. Kyle Busch won his second consecutive pole.

Failed to qualify: None, only 36 entries

Kroger 250 
The Kroger 250 was held on March 30 at Martinsville Speedway. Rick Crawford won the pole.

Failed to qualify: None, only 36 entries

O'Reilly Auto Parts 250 
The O'Reilly Auto Parts 250 was held on April 25 and 27 at Kansas Speedway. Ron Hornaday Jr. won the pole.

Failed to qualify: None, only 35 entries

North Carolina Education Lottery 200 
The North Carolina Education Lottery 200 was held on May 15 at Lowe's Motor Speedway. Kyle Busch won the pole based on owners' points.

Failed to qualify: Wayne Edwards (#28), John Wes Townley (#09), Andy Ponstein (#02)

Mike Skinner had flipped after a hard hit from T. J. Bell

AAA Insurance 200 
The AAA Insurance 200 was held May 29 at Dover International Speedway. Ron Hornaday Jr. won the pole.

Failed to qualify: None, only 36 entries

WinStar World Casino 400 
The WinStar World Casino 400 was held on June 5 at Texas Motor Speedway. Johnny Sauter won his first career pole.

Failed to qualify: None, only 33 entries

Michigan 200 
The Michigan 200 was held on June 13 at Michigan International Speedway. Brian Ickler won his first career pole.

Failed to qualify: None, only 36 entries

Copart 200 
The Copart 200 was held on June 20 at Milwaukee Mile. Brian Ickler won the pole.

Failed to qualify: None, only 33 entries

MemphisTravel.com 200 
The MemphisTravel.com 200 was held on June 27 at Memphis Motorsports Park. Ron Hornaday Jr. won the Pole.

Failed to qualify: Andy Ponstein (#02), Paul Bamburak (#34)

Built Ford Tough 225 
The Built Ford Tough 225 was held on July 18 at Kentucky Speedway. Ron Hornaday Jr. won the Pole.

Failed to qualify: Ryan Mathews (#41), Jack Smith (#36), Dillon Oliver (#02)

AAA Insurance 200 
The AAA Insurance 200 was held on July 24 at O'Reilly Raceway Park. Colin Braun won the Pole.

Failed to qualify: None, only 35 entries

Toyota Tundra 200 
The Toyota Tundra 200 was held on August 1 at Nashville Superspeedway. Timothy Peters won the Pole.

Failed to qualify: None, only 34 entries

O' Reilly 200 
The O'Reilly 200 was held on August 19 at Bristol Motor Speedway. Ryan Newman won the Pole.

Failed to qualify: Tim Bainey Jr. (#00), Brandon Duchscherer (#83), Duane Bischoff (#27)

EnjoyIllinois.com 225 
The EnjoyIllinois.com 225 was held on August 28 at Chicagoland Speedway. Matt Crafton won the Pole.

Failed to qualify: Michelle Theriault (#72), John Jackson (#92), Ryan Hackett (#76)

Lucas Oil 200 
The Lucas Oil 200 was held on September 5 at Iowa Speedway. Mike Skinner won the Pole.

Failed to qualify: Dillon Oliver (#01)

Copart 200 
The Copart 200 was held on September 12 at Gateway International Raceway. Colin Braun won the Pole.

Failed to qualify: Dillon Oliver (#02), Jack Smith (#36), Ben Stancill (#63)

Heluva Good! 200 
The Heluva Good! 200 was held on September 19 at New Hampshire Motor Speedway. Mike Skinner won the Pole.

Failed to qualify: None, only 36 entries

Las Vegas 350 
The Las Vegas 350 was held on September 26 at Las Vegas Motor Speedway. Todd Bodine won the Pole.

Failed to qualify: None, only 35 entries

Kroger 200 
The Kroger 200 was held on October 24 at Martinsville Speedway. Mike Skinner won the Pole.

Failed to qualify: Tim Bainey Jr. (#00), Chris Lafferty (#89), Dan Brode (#01)

Mountain Dew 250 
The Mountain Dew 250 was held on October 31 at Talladega Superspeedway. Colin Braun won the Pole.

Failed to qualify: Mike Harmon (#42), Austin Dillon (#3)

WinStar World Casino 350 
The WinStar World Casino 350K was held on November 6 at Texas Motor Speedway. Matt Crafton won the Pole.

Failed to qualify: Lance Hooper (#65), Andy Ponstein (#02), John Jackson (#92)

Lucas Oil 150 
The Lucas Oil 150 was held on November 13 at Phoenix International Raceway. Johnny Sauter won the Pole.

Failed to qualify: None, only 36 entries

Ford 200 
The Ford 200 was held on November 20 at Homestead-Miami Speedway. Colin Braun won the Pole.

Failed to qualify: Mike Harmon (#05), Derek White (#92)

Full Drivers' Championship

(key) Bold – Pole position awarded by time. Italics – Pole position set by owner's points. * – Most laps led.

See also
2009 NASCAR Sprint Cup Series
2009 NASCAR Nationwide Series
2009 NASCAR Camping World East Series
2009 NASCAR Camping World West Series
2009 NASCAR Canadian Tire Series
2009 NASCAR Corona Series
2009 NASCAR Mini Stock Series
2009 in sports

External links
 NASCAR Official Website 
 NASCAR Craftsman Truck Series Home Page 
Truck Series Standings and Statistics for 2009

NASCAR Truck Series seasons